Maxomys baeodon, also known as the small Bornean maxomys or small spiny rat, is a species of rodent in the family Muridae. It is known only from Sarawak and Sabah in the Malaysian part of Borneo.

References

Maxomys
Endemic fauna of Malaysia
Rodents of Malaysia
Mammals described in 1894
Taxa named by Oldfield Thomas
Taxonomy articles created by Polbot